Jagharq Rural District is a rural district (dehestan) in Torqabeh District, Torqabeh and Shandiz County, Razavi Khorasan province, Iran. At the 2006 census, its population was 5,060, in 1,303 families.  The rural district has 5 villages.

References 

Rural Districts of Razavi Khorasan Province
Torqabeh and Shandiz County